The Flylight Motorfloater is a British ultralight trike, designed by Ben Ashman and produced by Flylight Airsports of Northamptonshire. The aircraft is supplied as a complete ready-to-fly-aircraft.

The Motorfloater was introduced at the Flying Show in Birmingham in 2010.

Design and development
The Motorfloater is intended as a simple, light and inexpensive aircraft with an emphasis on ease of handling and enjoyment, rather than speed. It was derived from the more complex Flylight Dragonfly and designed to comply with the Fédération Aéronautique Internationale microlight category as well as the US FAR 103 Ultralight Vehicles rules. It features a cable-braced hang glider-style high-wing, weight-shift controls, a single-seat open cockpit without a cockpit fairing, tricycle landing gear without wheel pants and a single engine in pusher configuration.

The aircraft is made from bolted-together aluminum tubing, with its single surface wing covered in Dacron sailcloth. Its standard  span Aeros Fox 16T wing is supported by a single tube-type kingpost and uses an "A" frame weight-shift control bar. Powerplants available are the single cylinder, air-cooled, four-stroke,  Bailey V4 200 engine and the single cylinder, air-cooled, two-stroke,  Simonini Mini 2 engine.

A number of different wings can be fitted to the basic carriage, including the standard Aeros Fox 16T, Aeros Discus 14T and 15T as well as the Aeros Combat 12T.

Specifications (Motorfloater with Fox 16T wing)

References

External links

2010s British sport aircraft
2010s British ultralight aircraft
Single-engined pusher aircraft
Ultralight trikes